The Schumann House is a cultural site in Leipzig in Germany. The musicians Robert Schumann and his wife Clara lived here for their first four years of marriage; there are now exhibition rooms in their former apartment, about their life and work.

Background
The building was constructed, in Neoclassical style, by Friedrich August Schiedel in 1838. Robert and Clara Schumann, after their marriage in September 1840, lived here until 1844 in an apartment on the first floor.

Guests the Schumanns received here include Felix Mendelssohn, Franz Liszt and Hector Berlioz. Works composed by Robert Schumann during this period include the Spring Symphony, the three String Quartets and the Piano Quintet.

Exhibition
The building, apart from the  exhibition rooms on the first floor, is now the independent primary school "Clara Schumann". Among the exhibition rooms are the Schumann Salon, where the Schumanns received guests; the Travel Room, which is concerned with concert tours to Denmark in 1842 and Russia in 1844; and the Sound Room (Klangraum), designed in the style of the Biedermeier period, which contains an interactive sound installation by the artist .

See also
 Robert Schumann House
 Lindenmuseum Clara Schumann
 List of music museums

References

Biographical museums in Germany
Music museums in Germany
Museums in Saxony
Robert Schumann